The Thompson Trophy race was one of the National Air Races of the heyday of early airplane racing in the 1930s. Established in 1929, the last race was held in 1961. As the race was flown around a closed course, crowds in the grandstands could easily see much of the spectacle.

There were two series of Thompson races. The first series followed the award of a "Thompson Cup" in the 1929 National Air Races to the winner of the "International Land Plane Free-For-All" (that is, the unlimited class race). Thompson Products (a predecessor to TRW) decided to sponsor a trophy to be awarded for the next ten years for unlimited class racing (though a stipulation was eventually added excluding women pilots). The trophy was designed by Walter Sinz and is now at Air and Space Museum. Sinz also made a pair of  models of the trophy for promotional purposes. Races were held for the next ten years, ending in September 1939. Further races in this series were precluded by the onset of war.

After World War II the original trophy was (according to stipulation) retired. Also, advances in airplane technology, especially the advent of the turbojet, complicated matters. It was decided to establish a new series, with "R" (piston engine) and "J" (jet-powered) divisions. The "R" class was for civilian competition; the "J" division was for military pilots and was administered by the United States Air Force. Roscoe Turner, the last winner of the pre-war trophy, refused to relinquish it, but the original molds were located, and two additional casts were made, differing only in the legend engraved at the base and by placards identifying the division. Division "R" races were held from 1946 to 1949; Division "J" races (also known as "Military Speed Dashes") were held from 1951 to 1961, except 1952 and 1960.

Winners

See also

 List of aviation awards

References

External links

 THE THOMPSON TROPHY STORY
 The Major Trophy Races of the Golden Age of Air Racing
 Thompson Trophy on Air Racing History site
 “Doolittle Tames the Gee Bee”. Online reprint of Nov. 1994 article from Aviation History magazine. Includes photos & video.

Air races
Aviation awards